Verdura is a river of southern Sicily. Its source is in Lake Favara, and flows into the Sicily Channel at Torre Verdura, between Sciacca and Ribera.

Course
The upper reaches are known as the Sosio, becoming the Verdura after it is joined by the Lisandro. There are two hydroelectric dams, at Cristia and Favara. The fertile valley produces navel oranges, almonds, wine and olive oil.

See also
Fulco di Verdura, jeweller, and the last person to bear the now-defunct Sicilian ducal title of Verdura.

Notes and references

Rivers of the Province of Agrigento
Rivers of Italy
Rivers of Sicily
European drainage basins of the Mediterranean Sea